Hermann Howaldt (26 November 1852, Kiel - 17 May 1900, Kiel) was a German engineer and entrepreneur; co-founder and board member of "Howaldtswerke AG", now Howaldtswerke-Deutsche Werft (HDW).

Life and work 
He then completed a formal study of the subject at the Technical University of Hanover.

When the company was incorporated as "Howaldtswerke AG" in 1889, he became a board member and Director of the machine factory. It is generally believed that he died from overwork.

He was married twice, to Emma Amalia Christiane, née Jungclaussen (1859-1885), and her sister, Maria Elisabeth Magdalena (1852-1930). He had five children, altogether. His son, Erwin, married Anneliese Scheibe, daughter of the mineralogist, .

In 2005, HDW became a division of "ThyssenKrupp Marine Systems".

Sources 
 
 Christian Ostersehlte: Von Howaldt zu HDW. Koehlers Verlagsgesellschaft mbH, Hamburg 2004, .
 Hermann Howaldt In: Biographisches Lexikon für Schleswig-Holstein und Lübeck. Band 12, Neumünster 2006, pps.214 ff.

External links 
 Treffpunkt Howaldt, homepage for the Howaldt family website

1852 births
1900 deaths
Engineers from Schleswig-Holstein
German shipbuilders
German mechanical engineers
Businesspeople from Kiel